Bucculatrix mehadiensis is a moth in the family Bucculatricidae. It was described by Hans Rebel in 1903. It is found in Romania.

The wingspan is 7-7.3 mm. The forewings are white with three black marks The hindwings are blackish-grey.

References

Natural History Museum Lepidoptera generic names catalog

Bucculatricidae
Moths described in 1903
Moths of Europe
Taxa named by Hans Rebel